Thomas  Burleigh Kurishingal is an Indian actor, director, producer, script writer, music composer in Malayalam cinema, and author of  in English.

Biography
He was born to Kurishingal K. J. Berly (also spelt Burleigh) a freedom fighter and Annie Burleigh (a woman activist and leader of the pre-independence era who led a satyagraha against toddy shops in fort Cochin), on 1 September 1932 at Fort Kochi, Kerala. His debut movie was Thiramala in 1953 as a 21 year old perhaps becoming one of the youngest heroes in Malayalam film industry at that time. He later went to do a course on acting in University of California, Los Angeles. There he acted in a few English movies and television series in small roles. He acted in a Hollywood movie Never So Few in 1959. He produced an English movie, Maya for children. He is also interested in magic, violin, Madeleine instrumental music and painting. His painting Galiyan is selected and shown on International festivals. Later in 1969 he came back and started seafood exporting business. In 1973 he directed a movie, Ithu Manushyano?. Popular song Sughamoru bindu dukhamoru bindu is from this movie. Then he directed Vellarikkaappattanam in 1985 with Veteran actor Prem Nazir as hero. He published a collection of English writings to his credit Beyond Heart (published 2000), which prose-poetry, Fragrant Petals (2004), in memory of his father. He has also published a cartoon book, O Kerala (2007). and Sacred Savage, a historical novel (2017). He is married to Sophy. They have three children, Tanya, Tarun and Tamina and three grandchildren Tahir, Kiara and Kayaan. He currently resides at his family home in Fort Kochi, Kerala.

Filmography

As an actor
 Thiramaala (1953)
 Double Barrel (2015)

Direction
 Ithu Manushyano (1973)
 Vellarikkaappattanam (1985)

Story
 Ithu Manushyano? (1973)
 Vellarikkaappattanam (1985)

Screenplay
 Ithu Manushyano? (1973)
 Vellarikkaappattanam (1985)

Production
 Ithu Manushyano? (1973)
 Vellarikkaappattanam (1985)

Dialogue
 Ithu Manushyano? (1973)

Music
 "Mangalangal"... Vellarikkaappattanam (1985) 
 "Romaancham Poothirangum"... Vellarikkaappattanam 
 "Hemantha Kalam" ... Vellarikkaappattanam

References

External links

Male actors from Kochi
Male actors in Malayalam cinema
Indian male film actors
Malayalam film directors
Malayalam screenwriters
Malayalam film producers
Malayalam film score composers
1932 births
Living people
Film producers from Kochi
Film directors from Kochi
Musicians from Kochi
20th-century Indian film directors
Screenwriters from Kochi